The following highways are numbered 406:

Canada
 Manitoba Provincial Road 406
 Newfoundland and Labrador Route 406
 Ontario Highway 406

Costa Rica
 National Route 406

Israel
 Route 406 (Israel)

Japan
 Japan National Route 406

United States
 Florida:
  Florida State Road 406
  Florida State Road 406A
  County Road 406 (Brevard County, Florida)
  Georgia State Route 406 (unsigned designation for Interstate 59)
  Louisiana Highway 406
  Maryland Route 406 (former)
  New Mexico State Road 406
 New York:
  New York State Route 406
  County Route 406 (Erie County, New York)
  Puerto Rico Highway 406
  Virginia State Route 406
 Virginia State Route 406 (former)